André Montagard (1888 – 28 February 1963) was a French songwriter and poet. He wrote the lyrics to several songs, including Maréchal, nous voilà !, one of two national anthems during Vichy France. He published four poetry collections about Provence in the 1950s and 1960s.

Early life
André Montagard was born in 1888.

Career
Montagard wrote the lyrics to Une partie de pétanque in 1937; it was re-edited in 1941. It was sung by Darcelys.

Montagard wrote the lyrics to Maréchal, nous voilà ! while Charles Cortioux composed the music. The song became one of the national anthems alongside La Marseillaise during Vichy France. However, Montagnard and Courtioux actually plagiarized another song composed by Polish Jewish composer and future Holocaust victim Kazimierz Oberfeld, "".

Montagard also wrote the lyrics to La France de demain, another Vichy-inspired song composed by Cortioux. It was used in the antisemitic and anti-American short film Les Corrupteurs, directed by Pierre Ramelot in 1941.

Montagard wrote the lyrics to the hymn for Pierre Poujade's Union for the Defense of Tradesmen and Artisans in 1955.

Montagard published four poetry collections about Provence in the 1950s and 1960s.

Death
Montagard died on 28 February 1963.

Works

References

1888 births
1963 deaths
French songwriters
Male songwriters
French male poets
20th-century French poets
People of Vichy France
20th-century French male writers